Oinia may refer to:
 Oinia, a genus of wasps in the family Eulophidae, synonym of Acrias
 Oinia, a genus of spiders in the family Linyphiidae, synonym of Eskovina